Crambidia cinnica is a moth of the family Erebidae. It was described by Schaus in 1924. It is found in Mexico.

References

Lithosiina
Moths described in 1924